The Beetle was the nickname of a large mobile manipulator built by Jered Industries in Detroit for General Electric and ordered by the Air Force Special Weapons Center. It was designed to handle nuclear material for nuclear bombers. Work on the Beetle began in 1959 and it was completed in 1961. It was built on a chassis from a M42 Duster. The Beetle was 19 feet long, 12 feet wide, 11 feet high and weighed 77 tons. The top speed was 8 miles per hour.

In popular culture 
 Gundam Century
 Metal Gear Solid V: The Phantom Pain

See also
Mecha

References 

Individual mecha